The traits of extraversion (also spelled extroversion) and introversion are a central dimension in some human personality theories. The terms introversion and extraversion were introduced into psychology by Carl Jung, although both the popular understanding and current psychological usage vary. Extraversion tends to be manifested in outgoing, talkative, energetic behavior, whereas introversion is manifested in more reflective and reserved behavior. Jung defined introversion as an "attitude-type characterised by orientation in life through subjective psychic contents", and extraversion as "an attitude-type characterised by concentration of interest on the external object".

Extraversion and introversion are typically viewed as a single continuum, so to be higher in one necessitates being lower in the other. Jung provides a different perspective and suggests that everyone has both an extraverted side and an introverted side, with one being more dominant than the other. Virtually all comprehensive models of personality include these concepts in various forms. Examples include the Big Five model, Jung's analytical psychology, Hans Eysenck's three-factor model, Raymond Cattell's 16 personality factors, the Minnesota Multiphasic Personality Inventory, and the Myers–Briggs Type Indicator.

Varieties
William McDougall discussed Jung's conception, and reached this conclusion: "the introverts are those in whom reflective thought inhibits and postpones action and expression: the extroverts are those in whom the energies liberated upon the stirring of any propensity flow out freely in outward action and expression."

Extraversion
Extraversion is the state of primarily obtaining gratification from outside oneself. Extraverts tend to enjoy human interactions and to be enthusiastic, talkative, assertive, and gregarious. Extraverts are energized and thrive off being around other people. They take pleasure in activities that involve large social gatherings, such as parties, community activities, public demonstrations, and business or political groups. They also tend to work well in groups. An extraverted person is likely to enjoy time spent with people and find less reward in time spent alone. They tend to be energized when around other people, and they are more prone to boredom when they are by themselves.

Introversion

Introversion is the state of primarily obtaining gratification from one's own mental life. Introverts are typically perceived as more reserved or reflective. Some popular psychologists have characterized introverts as people whose energy tends to expand through reflection and dwindle during interaction. This is similar to Jung's view, although he focused on mental energy rather than physical energy. Few modern conceptions make this distinction. Introverts often take pleasure in solitary activities such as reading, writing, or meditating. An introvert is likely to enjoy time spent alone and find less reward in time spent with large groups of people. Introverts are easily overwhelmed by too much stimulation from social gatherings and engagement, introversion having even been defined by some in terms of a preference for a quiet, more minimally stimulating external environment. They prefer to concentrate on a single activity at a time and like to observe situations before they participate, especially observed in developing children and adolescents. They are more analytical before speaking.

Mistaking introversion for shyness is a common error. Introversion is a preference, while shyness stems from distress. Introverts prefer solitary to social activities, but do not necessarily fear social encounters like shy people do. Susan Cain, author of the book Quiet: The Power of Introverts in a World That Can't Stop Talking, argues that modern Western culture misjudges the capabilities of introverted people, leading to a waste of talent, energy, and happiness. Cain describes how society is biased against introverts, and that, with people being taught from childhood that to be sociable is to be happy, introversion is now considered "somewhere between a disappointment and pathology". In contrast, Cain says that introversion is not a "second-class" trait but that both introverts and extraverts enrich society, with examples including the introverts J. K. Rowling, Isaac Newton, Albert Einstein, Mahatma Gandhi, Dr. Seuss, W. B. Yeats, Steven Spielberg, and Larry Page.

Ambiversion 
Most contemporary trait theories measure levels of extraversion-introversion as part of a single, continuous dimension of personality, with some scores near one end, and others near the halfway mark. Ambiversion is falling more or less in the middle.

Relative prevalence
Cain further reports that studies indicate that 33 to 50% of the American population are introverts. Particular demographics have higher prevalence, with a 6,000-subject MBTI-based survey indicating that 60% of attorneys, and 90% of intellectual property attorneys, are introverts.

Measurement
The extent of extraversion and introversion is most commonly assessed through self-report measures, although peer-reports and third-party observation can also be used. Self-report measures are either lexical or based on statements. The type of measure is determined by an assessment of psychometric properties, and the time and space constraints of the research being undertaken.

Lexical self-reporting 
Lexical measures use individual adjectives that reflect extravert and introvert traits, such as outgoing, talkative, reserved and quiet. Words representing introversion are reverse-coded to create composite measures of extraversion-introversion running on a continuum. Goldberg (1992) developed a 20-word measure as part of his 100-word Big Five markers. Saucier (1994) developed a briefer 8-word measure as part of his 40-word mini-markers. However, the psychometric properties of Saucier's original mini-markers have been found to be suboptimal with samples outside of North America. As a result, a systematically revised measure was developed to have better psychometric properties, the International English Mini-Markers. The International English Mini-Markers has good internal consistency reliabilities, and other validity, for assessing extraversion-introversion and other five-factor personality dimensions, both within and, especially, without American populations. Internal consistency reliability of the extraversion measure for native English-speakers is reported as a Cronbach's alpha (α) of 0.92, that for non-native English-speakers is α of 0.85.

Statement self-reporting 
Statement measures tend to contain more words, and hence consume more research instrument space, than lexical measures. Respondents are asked the extent to which they, for example, "Talk to a lot of different people at parties or Often feel uncomfortable around others". While some statement-based measures of extraversion-introversion have similarly acceptable psychometric properties in North American populations to lexical measures, their generally emic development makes them less suited to use in other populations. For example, statements asking about talkativeness in parties are hard to answer meaningfully by those who do not attend parties, as Americans are assumed to do. Moreover, the sometimes colloquial North American language of statements makes them less suited for use outside America. For instance, statements like "Keep in the background" and "Know how to captivate people" are sometimes hard for non-native English-speakers to understand, except in a literal sense.

Eysenck's theory
Hans Eysenck described extraversion-introversion as the degree to which a person is outgoing and interactive with other people. These behavioral differences are presumed to be the result of underlying differences in brain physiology. Eysenck associated cortical inhibition and excitation with the ascending reticular activation system (ARAS), a pathway located in the brainstem. Extraverts seek excitement and social activity in an effort to raise their naturally low arousal level, whereas introverts tend to avoid social situations in an effort to avoid raising their naturally high arousal level too far. Eysenck designated extraversion as one of three major traits in his P-E-N model of personality, which also includes psychoticism and neuroticism.

Eysenck originally suggested that extraversion was a combination of two major tendencies, impulsiveness and sociability. He later added several other more specific traits, namely liveliness, activity level, and excitability. These traits are further linked in his personality hierarchy to even more specific habitual responses, such as partying on the weekend.

Eysenck compared this trait to the four temperaments of ancient medicine, with choleric and sanguine temperaments equating to extraversion, and melancholic and phlegmatic temperaments equating to introversion.

Biological factors
The relative importance of nature versus environment in determining the level of extraversion is controversial and the focus of many studies. Twin studies have found a genetic component of 39% to 58%. In terms of the environmental component, the shared family environment appears to be far less important than individual environmental factors that are not shared between siblings.

Eysenck proposed that extraversion was caused by variability in cortical arousal. He hypothesized that introverts are characterized by higher levels of activity than extraverts and so are chronically more cortically aroused than extraverts. That extraverts require more external stimulation than introverts has been interpreted as evidence for this hypothesis. Other evidence of the "stimulation" hypothesis is that introverts salivate more than extraverts in response to a drop of lemon juice. This is due to increased activity in their ARAS, which responds to stimuli like food or social contact.

Extraversion has been linked to higher sensitivity of the mesolimbic dopamine system to potentially rewarding stimuli. This in part explains the high levels of positive affect found in extraverts, since they will more intensely feel the excitement of a potential reward. One consequence of this is that extraverts can more easily learn the contingencies for positive reinforcement, since the reward itself is experienced as greater.

One study found that introverts have more blood flow in the frontal lobes of their brain and the anterior or frontal thalamus, which are areas dealing with internal processing, such as planning and problem solving. Extraverts have more blood flow in the anterior cingulate gyrus, temporal lobes, and posterior thalamus, which are involved in sensory and emotional experience. This study and other research indicate that introversion-extraversion is related to individual differences in brain function. A study on regional brain volume found a positive correlation between introversion and grey matter volume in the right prefrontal cortex and right temporoparietal junction, as well as a positive correlation between introversion and total white matter volume. Task-related functional neuroimaging has shown that extraversion is associated with increased activity in the anterior cingulate gyrus, prefrontal cortex, middle temporal gyrus, and the amygdala.

Extraversion has also been linked to physiological factors such as respiration, through its association with surgency.

Behaviour
Various differences in behavioural characteristics are attributed to extraverts and introverts. According to one study, extraverts tend to wear more decorative clothing, whereas introverts prefer practical, comfortable clothes. Extraverts are more likely to prefer more upbeat, conventional, and energetic music than introverts. Personality also influences how people arrange their work areas. In general, extraverts decorate their offices more, keep their doors open, keep extra chairs nearby, and are more likely to put dishes of candy on their desks. These are attempts to invite co-workers and encourage interaction. Introverts, in contrast, decorate less and tend to arrange their workspace to discourage social interaction.

Despite these differences, a meta-analysis of 15 experience sampling studies has suggested that there is a great deal of overlap in the way that extraverts and introverts behave. In these studies, participants used mobile devices to report how extraverted (e.g., bold, talkative, assertive, outgoing) they were acting at multiple times during their daily lives. Fleeson and Gallagher (2009) found that extraverts regularly behave in an introverted way, and introverts regularly behave in an extraverted way. Indeed, there was more within-person variability than between-person variability in extraverted behaviours. The key feature that distinguishes extraverts and introverts was that extraverts tend to act moderately extraverted about 5–10% more often than introverts. From this perspective, extraverts and introverts are not "fundamentally different". Rather, an "extravert" is just someone who acts more extraverted more often, suggesting that extraversion is more about what one "does" than what one "has".

Additionally, a study by Lippa (1978) found evidence for the extent to which individuals present themselves in a different way. This is called expressive behaviour, and it is dependent upon the individuals' motivation and ability to control that behaviour. Lippa (1978) examined 68 students who were asked to role-play by pretending to teach a math class. The students' level of extraversion and introversion were rated based on their external/expressive behaviours such as stride length, graphic expansiveness, the percentage of time they spent talking, the amount of time they spent making eye contact, and the total time of each teaching session. This study found that actual introverts were perceived and judged as having more extraverted-looking expressive behaviours because they were higher in terms of their self-monitoring. This means that the introverts consciously put more effort into presenting a more extraverted, and rather socially desirable, version of themselves. Thus, individuals are able to regulate and modify behaviour based on their environmental situations.

Humans are complex and unique, and because introversion-extraversion varies along a continuum, individuals may have a mixture of both orientations. A person who acts introverted in one situation may act extraverted in another, and people can learn to act in "counter dispositional" ways in certain situations. For example, Brian Little's free trait theory suggests that people can take on "free traits", behaving in ways that may not be their "first nature", but can strategically advance projects that are important to them. Together, this presents an optimistic view of what extraversion is. Rather than being fixed and stable, individuals vary in their extraverted behaviours across different moments, and can choose to act extraverted to advance important personal projects or even increase their happiness, as mentioned above.

Implications
Acknowledging that introversion and extraversion are normal variants of behavior can help in self-acceptance and understanding of others. For example, an extravert can accept their introverted partner's need for solitude, while an introvert can acknowledge their extraverted partner's need for social interaction.

Researchers have found a correlation between extraversion and self-reported happiness. That is, more extraverted people tend to report higher levels of happiness than introverts. Other research has shown that being instructed to act in an extraverted manner leads to increases in positive affect, even for people who are trait-level introverts.

This does not mean that introverts are unhappy. Extraverts simply report experiencing more positive emotions, whereas introverts tend to be closer to neutral. This may be because extraversion is socially preferable in contemporary Western culture and thus introversion feels less desirable. In addition to the research on happiness, other studies have found that extraverts tend to report higher levels of self-esteem than introverts. Others suggest that such results reflect socio-cultural bias in the survey itself. Dr. David Meyers has claimed that happiness is a matter of possessing three traits: self-esteem, optimism, and extraversion. Meyers bases his conclusions on studies that report extraverts to be happier; these findings have been questioned in light of the fact that the "happiness" prompts given to the studies' subjects, such as "I like to be with others" and "I'm fun to be with," only measure happiness among extraverts. Also, according to Carl Jung, introverts acknowledge more readily their psychological needs and problems, whereas extraverts tend to be oblivious to them because they focus more on the outer world.

Although extraversion is perceived as socially desirable in Western culture, it is not always an advantage. For example, extraverted youths are more likely to engage in antisocial or delinquent behavior. In line with this, certain evidence suggest that the trait of extraversion may also be related to that of psychopathy. Conversely, while introversion is perceived as less socially desirable, it is strongly associated with positive traits such as intelligence and "giftedness." For many years, researchers have found that introverts tend to be more successful in academic environments, which extraverts may find boring.

Research shows that behavioral immune system, the psychological processes that infer infection risk from perceptual cues and respond to these perceptual cues through the activation of aversive emotions,  may influence gregariousness. Although extraversion is associated with many positive outcomes like higher levels of happiness, those extraverted people are also more likely to be exposed to communicable diseases, such as airborne infections, as they tend to have more contact with people. When individuals are more vulnerable to infection, the cost of being social will be relatively greater. Therefore, people tend to be less extraversive when they feel vulnerable and vice versa.

Although neither introversion nor extraversion is pathological, psychotherapists can take temperament into account when treating clients. Clients may respond better to different types of treatment depending on where they fall on the introversion-extraversion spectrum. Teachers can also consider temperament when dealing with their pupils, for example acknowledging that introverted children need more encouragement to speak in class while extraverted children may grow restless during long periods of quiet study.

Regional variation
Some claim that Americans live in an "extraverted society" that rewards extravert behavior and rejects introversion. This is because the U.S. is a culture of external personality, whereas in some other cultures people are valued for their "inner selves and their moral rectitude".
Other cultures, such as those in Japan, China and regions where Orthodox Christianity, Buddhism, Sufism etc. prevail, prize introversion. These cultural differences predict individuals' happiness in that people who score higher in extraversion are happier, on average, in particularly extraverted cultures and vice versa.

Researchers have found that people who live on islands tend to be less extraverted (more introverted) than those living on the mainland, and that people whose ancestors had inhabited the island for twenty generations tend to be less extraverted than more recent arrivals. Furthermore, people who emigrate from islands to the mainland tend to be more extraverted than people that stay on islands, and those that immigrate to islands.

In the United States, researchers have found that people living in the midwestern states of North Dakota, South Dakota, Nebraska, Minnesota, Wisconsin, and Illinois score higher than the U.S. average on extraversion. Utah and the southeastern states of Florida and Georgia also score high on this personality trait. The most introverted states in the U.S. are Maryland, New Hampshire, Alaska, Washington, Oregon and Vermont. People who live in the northwestern states of Idaho, Montana, and Wyoming are also relatively introverted.

Relation to happiness
As earlier stated, extraverts are often found to have higher levels of positive affect than introverts. However, this relationship has only been found between extraversion and activated forms of positive affect. There is no relationship between extraversion and deactivated (calm) forms of positive affect such as contentment or serenity, although one study found a negative relationship between extraversion and deactivated positive affect (i.e. a positive relationship between introversion and calm positive affect). Moreover, the relationship between extraversion and activated positive affect is only significant for agentic extraversion, i.e. there is no significant relationship between affiliative extraversion and activated positive affect, especially when controlling for neuroticism.

An influential review article concluded that personality, specifically extraversion and emotional stability, was the best predictor of subjective well-being. As examples, Argyle and Lu (1990) found that the trait of extraversion, as measured by Extraversion Scale of the Eysenck Personality Questionnaire (EPQ), was positively and significantly correlated with positive affect, as measured by the Oxford Happiness Inventory. Using the same positive affect and extraversion scales, Hills and Argyle (2001) found that positive affect was again significantly correlated with extraversion. Also, the study by Emmons and Diener (1986) showed that extraversion correlates positively and significantly with positive affect but not with negative affect. Similar results were found in a large longitudinal study by Diener, Sandvik, Pavot, and Fujita (1992), which assessed 14,407 participants from 100 areas of continental United States. Using the abbreviated General Well-Being Schedule, which tapped positive and negative affects, and Costa and McCrae's (1986). short version of the NEO's Extraversion scale, the authors reported that extraverts experienced greater well-being at two points in time, during which data were collected: first between 1971 and 1975, and later between 1981 and 1984. However, the latter study did not control for neuroticism, an important covariate when investigating relationships between extraversion and positive affect or wellbeing. Studies that controlled for neuroticism have found no significant relationship between extraversion and subjective well-being. Larsen and Ketelaar (1991) showed that extraverts respond more to positive affect than to negative affect, since they exhibit more positive-affect reactivity to the positive-affect induction, yet they do not react more negatively to the negative-affect induction.

Instrumental view
The instrumental view proposes that personality traits give rise to conditions and actions, which have affective consequences, and thus generate individual differences in emotionality.

Personality trait as a cause of higher sociability
According to the instrumental view, one explanation for greater subjective well-being among extraverts could be that extraversion helps in the creation of life circumstances, which promote high levels of positive affect. Specifically, the personality trait of extraversion is seen as a facilitator of more social interactions, since the low cortical arousal among extraverts results in them seeking more social situations in order to increase their arousal.

Social activity hypothesis
According to the social activity hypothesis, more frequent participation in social situations creates more frequent, and higher levels, of positive affect. Therefore, it is believed that since extraverts are characterized as more sociable than introverts, they also possess higher levels of positive affect brought on by social interactions. Specifically, the results of Furnham and Brewin's study (1990) suggest that extraverts enjoy and participate more in social activities than introverts, and as a result extraverts report a higher level of happiness. Also, in the study of Argyle and Lu (1990) extraverts were found to be less likely to avoid participation in noisy social activities, and to be more likely to participate in social activities such as party games, jokes, or going to the cinema. Similar results were reported by Diener, Larsen, and Emmons (1984) who found that extraverts seek social situations more often than introverts, especially when engaging in recreational activities.

However, a variety of findings contradict the claims of the social activity hypothesis. Firstly, it was found that extraverts were happier than introverts even when alone. Specifically, extraverts tend to be happier regardless of whether they live alone or with others, or whether they live in a vibrant city or quiet rural environment. Similarly, a study by Diener, Sandvik, Pavot, and Fujita (1992) showed that although extraverts chose social jobs relatively more frequently (51%) than nonsocial jobs compared to introverts (38%), they were happier than introverts regardless of whether their occupations had social or nonsocial character. Secondly, it was found that extraverts only sometimes reported greater amounts of social activity than introverts, but in general extraverts and introverts do not differ in the quantity of their socialization. Similar finding was reported by Srivastava, Angelo, and Vallereux (2008), who found that extraverts and introverts both enjoy participating in social interactions, but extraverts participate socially more. Thirdly, studies have shown that both extraverts and introverts participate in social relations, but that the quality of this participation differs. The more frequent social participation among extraverts could be explained by the fact that extraverts know more people, but those people are not necessarily their close friends, whereas introverts, when participating in social interactions, are more selective and have only few close friends with whom they have special relationships.

Social attention theory
Yet another explanation of the high correlation between extraversion and happiness comes from the study by Ashton, Lee, and Paunonen (2002). They suggested that the core element of extraversion is a tendency to behave in ways that attract, hold, and enjoy social attention, and not reward sensitivity. They claimed that one of the fundamental qualities of social attention is its potential of being rewarding. Therefore, if a person shows positive emotions of enthusiasm, energy, and excitement, that person is seen favorably by others and he or she gains others' attention. This favorable reaction from others likely encourages extraverts to engage in further extraverted behavior. Ashton, Lee, and Paunonen's (2002) study showed that their measure of social attention, the Social Attention Scale, was much more highly correlated with extraversion than were measures of reward sensitivity.

Temperamental view
Temperamental view is based on the notion that there is a direct link between people's personality traits and their sensitivity to positive and negative affects.

Affective reactivity model
The affective reactivity model states that the strength of a person's reactions to affect-relevant events are caused by people's differences in affect. This model is based on the reinforcement sensitivity theory by Jeffrey Alan Gray, which states that people with stronger behavioral activation system (BAS) are high in reward responsiveness and are predisposed to the personality trait of extraversion, while people with a stronger behavioral inhibition system (BIS) are lower in reward responsiveness and are more predisposed to personality trait of neuroticism and introversion. Therefore, extraverts are seen as having a temperamental predisposition to positive affect since positive mood induction has a greater effect on them than on introverts, thus extraverts are more prone to react to pleasant effects. For example, Gable, Reis, and Elliot (2000). found in two consecutive studies that people with more sensitive BIS reported higher levels of average negative affect, while people with more sensitive BAS reported higher levels of positive affect. Also, Zelenski and Larsen (1999) found that people with more sensitive BAS reported more positive emotions during the positive mood induction, while people with more sensitive BIS reported more negative emotions during the negative mood induction.

Social reactivity theory
The social reactivity theory alleges that all humans, whether they like it or not, are required to participate in social situations. Since extraverts prefer engaging in social interactions more than introverts, they also derive more positive affect from such situations than introverts do. The support for this theory comes from work of Brian R. Little, who popularized concept of "restorative niches". Little claimed that life often requires people to participate in social situations, and since acting social is out of character for introverts, it was shown to harm their well-being. Therefore, one way to preserve introverts' well-being is for them to recharge as often as possible in places where they can return to their true selves—places Little calls "restorative niches".

However, it was also found that extraverts did not respond stronger to social situations than introverts, nor did they report bigger boosts of positive affect during such interactions.

Affective regulation
Another possible explanation for more happiness among extraverts comes from the fact that extraverts are able to better regulate their affective states. This means that in ambiguous situations (situations where positive and negative moods are introduced and mixed in similar proportions) extraverts show a slower decrease of positive affect, and, as a result, they maintained a more positive affect balance than introverts. Extraverts may also choose activities that facilitate happiness (e.g., recalling pleasant vs. unpleasant memories) more than introverts when anticipating difficult tasks.

The set-point model aka affect-level model
According to the set-point model, levels of positive and negative affects are more or less fixed within each individual, hence, after a positive or negative event, people's moods tend to go back to the pre-set level. According to the set-point model, extraverts experience more happiness because their pre-set level of positive affect is set higher than the pre-set point of positive affect in introverts, therefore extraverts require less positive reinforcement in order to feel happy.

Pleasure-arousal relation
A study by Peter Kuppens (2008) showed that extraverts and introverts engage in different behaviors when feeling pleasant, which may explain underestimation of the frequency and intensity of happiness exhibited by introverts. Specifically, Kuppens (2008) found that arousal and pleasantness are positively correlated for extraverts, which means that pleasant feelings are more likely to be accompanied by high arousal for extraverts. On the other hand, arousal and pleasantness are negatively correlated for introverts, resulting in introverts exhibiting low arousal when feeling pleasant. In other words, if everything is going well in an extravert's life, which is a source of pleasant feelings, extraverts see such a situation as an opportunity to engage in active behavior and goal pursuit, which brings about an active, aroused pleasant state. When everything is going well for introverts, they see it as an opportunity to let down their guard, resulting in them feeling relaxed and content.

Complications to the extraversion-happiness correlation

Though extraversion has consistently been shown to have a strong correlation with happiness and well-being, these findings are complicated by the presence of other personality traits that act as strong indicators of happiness.

Neuroticism and extraversion
In multiple studies, neuroticism has been shown to have an equal, if not larger, impact on happiness and subjective well-being than extraversion. One study classified school children into four categories based on their scores in assessments of extraversion and emotional stability (neuroticism). The results showed no significant difference between the happiness levels of stable introverts and stable extraverts, while unstable extraverts and introverts both demonstrated significantly less happiness than their counterparts. In this study, neuroticism appeared to be the more salient factor for overall well-being.

Likewise, in later studies, researchers used assessment scales to test for categories such as self-esteem and life-goal orientation, which they had positively correlated with happiness. Participants' responses to these scales suggested that neuroticism actually had a larger impact than extraversion in measures of well-being.

Other Big 5 factors and extraversion
Though extraversion and neuroticism seem to have the largest effect on personal happiness, other Big 5 personality factors have also been shown to correlate with happiness and subjective well-being. For example, one study showed that conscientiousness and agreeableness correlated about 0.20 with subjective well-being. While the effect of these traits was not as strong as extraversion or neuroticism, it is clear that they still have some impact on happiness outcomes.

Similarly, interactions between extraversion, neuroticism, and conscientiousness have demonstrated significant impacts on subjective well-being. In one study, researchers used three scales to assess subjective well-being. They found that extraversion only served as a predictor for one assessment, in conjunction with neuroticism, while the other two assessment outcomes were better predicted by conscientiousness and neuroticism. In addition to the importance of including other factors in happiness assessments, this study also demonstrates the manner in which an operational definition of well-being changes whether extraversion emerges as a salient predictive factor.

Other contributing personality factors
There is also evidence that other non-trait elements of personality may correlate with happiness. For instance, one study demonstrated that various features of one's goals, such as progress towards important goals or conflicts between them, can affect both emotional and cognitive well-being. Several other researchers have also suggested that, at least in more individualistic cultures, having a coherent sense of one's personality (and acting in a way that conforms to that self-concept) is positively related to well-being. Thus, focusing solely on extraversion—or even extraversion and neuroticism—is likely to provide an incomplete picture of the relationship between happiness and personality.

Culture
In addition, one's culture may also influence happiness and overall subjective well-being. The overall level of happiness fluctuates from culture to culture, as does preferred expression of happiness. Comparing various international surveys across countries reveals that different nations, and different ethnic groups within nations, exhibit differences in average life satisfaction.

For example, one researcher found that between 1958 and 1987, Japanese life satisfaction fluctuated around 6 on a 10-point scale, while Denmark's fluctuated around 8. Comparing ethnic groups within the United States, another study found that European Americans reported being "significantly happier" with their lives than Asian Americans.

Researchers have hypothesized a number of factors that could be responsible for these differences between countries, including national differences in overall income levels, self-serving biases and self-enhancement, and approach and avoidance orientations. Taken together, these findings suggest that while extraversion-introversion does have a strong correlation with happiness, it does not stand alone as a sole predictor of subjective well-being, and that other factors must be accounted for when trying to determine the correlates of happiness.

See also

 Analytical psychology
 Alternative five model of personality
 Personality
 Reinforcement sensitivity theory
 Seattle Freeze
 Trait theory

References

External links

 Secrets of a super successful introvert Susan Cain article from CNN Living
 TED talks – Susan Cain: The power of introverts  talk by Susan Cain, author of Quiet: The Power of Introverts in a World That Can't Stop Talking (January 2012), talks about reasons we should celebrate and encourage introversion
 Revenge of the Introvert Laurie Helgoe's article about introversion published in Psychology Today (2010)
 General description of the types Jung's original article (1921)
 USA Today article about CEO introverts/extraverts
 "Caring for Your Introvert" Article in The Atlantic, March 2003
 Scientific American article on Introversion
 Scientific American blogs: What Kind of Introvert are you?

Personality traits
Personality typologies
Carl Jung